José Canalejas (14 February 1925 – 1 May 2015) was a Spanish actor. He appeared in more than 100 films and television shows between 1960 and 1997. He died on 1 May 2015 at his home in Madrid at the age of 90.

He was the son of the soloist violinist Manuel Álvarez Trigo, grandson of the pianist and composer Arturo Canalejas, and brother of the actress and dancer Lina Canalejas, who died on 1 September 2012 from cancer at the age of 80.

Selected filmography

 Labios rojos (1960) – Paul, el pianista
 Torrejón City (1962) – Mejicano
 Il segno di Zorro (1963) – Teniente
 Gidget Goes to Rome (1963) – Pinchman (uncredited)
 Una chica casi formal (1963)
 Los conquistadores del Pacífico (1963)
 Llegar a más (1963)
 El escándalo (1964)
 Fuera de la ley (1964)
 A Fistful of Dollars (1964) – Rojo Gang Member (uncredited)
 Brandy (1964) – Chirlo
 La tumba del pistolero (1964) – Sbirro
 La boda (1964)
 100 Horsemen (1964) – Moorish Warrior (uncredited)
 Jesse James' Kid (1965) – Cabo
 The Relentless Four (1965) – Rex Calhoun
 For a Few Dollars More (1965) – Chico (Indio's Gang) (uncredited)
 Mutiny at Fort Sharpe (1966)
 Gunman Called Nebraska (1966) – Elmer Dowson
 Django (1966) – Member of Hugo's Gang
 Per il gusto di uccidere (1966) – Peter
 Sugar Colt (1966) – Bearded Bandit
 The Ugly Ones (1966)
 The Hellbenders (1967) – Mexican Bandit
 El hombre que mató a Billy el Niño (1967) – Jake – Travis's Henchman
 Un hombre y un colt (1967)
 El halcón de Castilla (1967)
 God Forgives... I Don't! (1967) – Mexican henchman
 Cervantes (1967) – (uncredited)
 15 Scaffolds for a Murderer (1967) – Tim, Mack's Blond Henchman
 Killer Adios (1968) – Manuel, Lobo Henchman (uncredited)
 Uno straniero a Paso Bravo (1968)
 A Minute to Pray, a Second to Die (1968) – Seminole – Bounty Hunter (uncredited)
 Villa Rides (1968) – Villa's Guerrillero Rapist Killed by Fierro (uncredited)
 Lo voglio morto (1968)
 All'ultimo sangue (1968) – Officer (uncredited)
 Uno dopo l'altro (1968) – Frank
 El secreto del capitán O'Hara (1968) – Wills
 The Mercenary (1968) – Lerkin
 White Comanche (1968) – (uncredited)
 Cemetery Without Crosses (1969) – Vallee Brother (uncredited)
 Sundance and the Kid (1969) – Ranger (uncredited)
 The Price of Power (1969) – Deputy (uncredited)
 Sabata the Killer (1970) – Chaco
 Adiós, Sabata (1970) – Duel Observer (uncredited)
 Compañeros (1970) – Mongo Henchman (uncredited)
 Reverend's Colt (1970) – Martin
 Black Beauty (1971) – Gate Sergant [Spanish prints] (uncredited)
 Grazie zio, ci provo anch'io (1971)
 Raise Your Hands, Dead Man, You're Under Arrest (1971) – Angel, Grayton's Henchman in Black
 La casa de las Chivas (1972) – Guzmán
 Sonny & Jed (O Bando J & S) (1972) – Don García Henchman (uncredited)
 Horror Express (1972) – Russian Guard
 Entre dos amores (1972) – Niño
 What Am I Doing in the Middle of a Revolution? (1972)
 The Man Called Noon (1973) – Cherry
 Ricco (1973)
 Three Supermen of the West (1973) – Buffalo Bill
 Return of the Blind Dead (1973) – Murdo
 The Three Musketeers of the West (1973) – Mendoza
 Dieci bianchi uccisi da un piccolo indiano (1974) – (uncredited)
 La dynamite est bonne à boire (1974)
 En la cresta de la ola (1975) – Redactor
 Il richiamo del lupo (1975) – Bates Henchman
 A Dragonfly for Each Corpse (1975) – Ruggero
 Docteur Justice (1975) – Khalid
 Si quieres vivir… dispara (1975) – Tex
 Ambitious (1976)
 La espada negra (1976)
 Le due orfanelle (1976)
 The Standard (1977)
  (1978) – Präsident Cusano
 Cabo de vara (1978)
 Tac-tac (1982) – Amigo de Ángel
 Femenino singular (1982)
 Huevos revueltos (1982)
 La desconocida (1983) – Dr. Salas
 Cuando Almanzor perdió el tambor (1984)
 Padre nuestro (1985) – Guardia Civil 1
 Serpiente de mar (1985)
 Bad Medicine (1985) – Professor Hugo
 White Apache (1987) – White Bear
 El Lute: Run for Your Life (1987) – Carcelero
 Scalps (1987) – Chief Black Eagle
 Niño nadie (1997) – Míster

References

External links

1925 births
2015 deaths
Spanish male film actors
Male actors from Madrid
Male Spaghetti Western actors